Jemima Kindersley née Wickstead (1741–1809) was an English travel writer, noted for her Letters from the Island of Teneriffe, Brazil, the Cape of Good Hope and the East Indies (1777).

Life
Jemima Wickstead was born in Norwich on 2 October 1741. She was well educated and widely read. She married Colonel Nathaniel Kindersley, of the Bengal Artillery, in 1762 at Great Yarmouth. They had a son, Nathaniel Edward Kindersley (1763-1831). She set sail for India in June 1764, her husband having traveled there earlier, and arrived in Pondicherry in June 1765, stopping along the way in Tenerife, Brazil and South Africa. She stayed in India until 1769, and died in Bath in 1809.

Writings
Kindersley wrote an account of her long voyage to India, including five months at the Cape of Good Hope, in the form of 68 letters. These were published in 1777 by John Nourse under the title of  "Letters from the Island of Teneriffe, Brazil, the Cape of Good Hope and the East Indies by Mrs. Kindersley", at the price of 3s 6d.

These letters were republished as volume 5 of the 8-volume Women's Travel Writing, 1750-1850 edited by Caroline Franklin (Routledge,) and included in Routledge's online resource History of Feminism.

In 1781 she published a translation of Antoine Léonard Thomas's work as Essay on the Character, Manners and Understanding of Women, including two of her own essays.

Response to writings
In 1778 the Reverend Henry Hodgson published Letters to Mrs. Kindersley, described as "animadverting upon portions of that lady's "Letters from the Island of Teneriffe,"  etc."

References

External links
The Travel Letters of Mrs. Kindersley Website including full text of 68 letters, and biographical information some of which is based on A History of the Kindersley Family by Arthur Fasken Kindersley, printed for private circulation, October, 1938, pp. 89–100.

Published letters

1741 births
1809 deaths
English travel writers
British women travel writers
Writers from Norwich
18th-century English non-fiction writers
English translators
18th-century English women writers
Jemima
18th-century British translators